Day of Atonement (original French title:Le Grand Pardon II) is a 1992 127-minute longer sequel to film Le Grand pardon, film directed by Alexandre Arcady starring Roger Hanin, Richard Berry, Gérard Darmon and Jill Clayburgh. The film also features famous American film stars Christopher Walken and Jennifer Beals. Filming locations include: Miami, Florida, United States and France.

Plot
Raymond Bettoun is released after 10 years in prison to come to his family in Miami, FL for his grandson Alexander's bar-mitzvah. His son, Maurice is a banker. Raymond soon finds out Maurice in laundering drug money. 
Raymond's nephew Roland lives in an island with his assistant Joseph. He is pulling the strings, stealing from Maurice's bank. Rolands brother Eli is planning to go away with Roland after he testify's again Maurice later on in the film.

Maurice comes into contact with drug lord Pasco Meisner who wants to be part of the same mob family as him. But Maurice's plan goes horribly wrong when members of his real family & drug family are all being killed off or kidnapped by Pasco & his assistant Verdugo, all when Roland too is trying to get Maurice killed to inherit the money from Maurice's bank.

Cast
Roger Hanin as Raymond Bettoun
Richard Berry as Maurice Bettoun
Gerard Darmon as Roland Bettoun
Christopher Walken as Pasco Meisner
Jill Clayburgh as Sally
Jennifer Beals as Joyce
Jean-Francois Stevenin as Eric Lemmonier
Jean Benguigui as Albert Bettoun
Raúl Dávila as Emilio Esteban
Alexandre Aja as Alexander Bettoun
Jim Moody as Danny Williams
Amidou as Si Ali
Armand Mestral as Freddy Ambrosi
Cameron Watson as Tom
Franck Khalfoun as Maurice's Bodyguard

Soundtrack
The soundtrack to the film was recorded by Italian composer Romano Musumarra. The CD soundtrack was released in France for a limited time.

Track listing

1. Le Grand Pardon
2. Little Havana
3. Yir Yir Ibon
4. Viviane
5. Alton Road
6. Khemdati
7. Saruba
8. Flash Back
9. Dope Rever
10. Moon Ray
11. Ya Oummie Ya Oummi
12. Pasaumes

External links
 IMDb entry

1992 films
1992 crime drama films
Films set in Miami
Films about families
American crime drama films
Films directed by Alexandre Arcady
1990s English-language films
1990s American films